Husri railway station 
(Sindhi:  هوسڙي ريلوي اسٽيشن) is  located in Sindh,  Pakistan.

See also
 List of railway stations in Pakistan
 Pakistan Railways

References

External links

Railway stations in Hyderabad District, Pakistan